Sejanci is a settlement in the Slovene Hills in the Municipality of Sveti Tomaž in northeastern Slovenia. The area belonged to the traditional region of Styria. It is now included in the Drava Statistical Region.

There are a small chapel and a chapel-shrine in the village, both dating from the early 20th century.

References

External links
Sejanci on Geopedia

Populated places in the Municipality of Sveti Tomaž